These Stars Are Mine is a 1943 Australian short film directed by George Malcolm and starring Peter Finch. It was a propaganda film for the war effort.

Plot
George Reynolds, recently discharged from the army, tells his widowed father of his plans to marry Gwen and relax. His father tells him that if Australia is to avoid another postwar Depression, its citizens need to work hard towards a better future. George points to statues of Matthew Flinders, Arthur Philip and Sir Henry Parkes to inspire his son.

Cast
Wilfrid Thomas as John Reynolds
Peter Finch as George Reynolds
Patricia Firman as Gwen

References

External links

Complete copy of film at National Film and Sound Archive

1943 films
Australian drama short films
Australian black-and-white films